The 2016 Segundona is the 22nd season of the second-tier football league in Angola. The season ran from 10 July to  October 2016.

The league comprises 2 series of 5 teams, the winner of each series being automatically promoted to the 2017 Girabola while the runners-up of each group will contest for the third spot. At the end of the regular season, the three series winners will play a round-robin tournament to determine the league champion.

Stadiums and locations

Serie A

Table and results

Match details

Round 1

Round 7

Round 2

Round 8

Round 3

Round 9

Round 4

Round 10

Round 5

Round 11

Round 6

Round 12

Serie B

Table and results

Match details

Round 1

Round 6

Round 2

Round 7

Round 3

Round 8

Round 4

Round 9

Round 5

Round 10

2017 Girabola playoff

2016 Segundona title match

See also
2016 Girabola

References

External links
Federação Angolana de Futebol

Segundona
Segundona
Angola